The 1990 Ben Hogan Tour season was the first season of the Ben Hogan Tour, the PGA Tour's official developmental tour, now known as the Korn Ferry Tour. The top five players on the final money list earned PGA Tour cards for 1991.

Schedule
The following table lists official events during the 1990 season.

Money leaders
For full rankings, see 1990 Ben Hogan Tour graduates.

The money list was based on prize money won during the season, calculated in U.S. dollars. The top five players on the tour earned status to play on the 1991 PGA Tour.

Awards

See also
1990 Ben Hogan Tour graduates

Notes

References

Korn Ferry Tour seasons
Ben Hogan Tour